Riaan Engelbrecht is a South African former rugby league footballer for the Tuks Bulls.

References

Engelbrecht
Engelbrecht
Tuks Bulls players
Rugby league centres
Rugby league five-eighths